Anjukladang Stadium is a football stadium in the town of Nganjuk, Nganjuk Regency, East Java, Indonesia. The stadium has a capacity of 10,000 people.

It is the home base of Persenga Nganjuk.

References

Nganjuk Regency
Sports venues in Indonesia
Football venues in Indonesia
Multi-purpose stadiums in Indonesia